Do It All Night may refer to:

"Do It All Night" (Prince song), a 1981 song by Prince
Do It All Night (album), a 1978 album by Curtis Mayfield, or the title song